"Ryde or Die, Bitch", (also known by its clean title, "Ryde or Die, Chick"), is the lead single released from The LOX's second album, We Are the Streets. The song was produced by Timbaland and featured him and Eve. It was the most successful single from the album, peaking at 73 on the US Billboard Hot 100, 27 on the Hot R&B/Hip-Hop Songs and 22 on the Hot Rap Singles.

Single track listing

A-Side
"Ryde or Die, Bitch" (LP Version)- 4:51
"Ryde or Die, Bitch" (Radio Edit)- 3:57
"Ryde or Die, Bitch" (Instrumental)- 4:51
"Ryde or Die, Bitch" (A Capella)- 4:51

B-Side
"We Are the Streets" (LP Version)- 3:41
"We Are the Streets" (Radio Edit)- 3:46
"We Are the Streets" (Instrumental)- 4:33
"Ryde or Die, Bitch" (TV track)- 4:51

1999 singles
The Lox songs
Eve (rapper) songs
Timbaland songs
Song recordings produced by Timbaland
Ruff Ryders Entertainment singles
Interscope Records singles
Gangsta rap songs
1999 songs
Songs written by Jadakiss